Rhipidolestes okinawanus is a species of damselfly in the family Rhipidolestidae. It is endemic to Japan.

References

Insects of Japan
Calopterygoidea
Insects described in 1951
Taxonomy articles created by Polbot